Jhon Jairo Quiceno (born 2 August 1954) is a Colombian former cyclist. He competed in the team pursuit event at the 1976 Summer Olympics.

References

External links
 

1954 births
Living people
Colombian male cyclists
Olympic cyclists of Colombia
Cyclists at the 1976 Summer Olympics
Place of birth missing (living people)